Count Palatine Wolfgang of Zweibrücken (26 September 1526 – 11 June 1569) was member of the Wittelsbach family of the Counts Palatine and Duke of Zweibrücken from 1532. With the support of his regent, his uncle Rupert (later made the Count of Veldenz), Wolfgang introduced the Reformation to Zweibrücken as early as 1537.

Biography
He was the only son of Louis II, Count Palatine of Zweibrücken and his wife Elisabeth of Hesse, daughter of William I, Landgrave of Hesse. His father died in 1532, so the regency of Palatinate-Zweibrücken passed to Louis' younger brother Rupert until 1543. In 1557 Wolfgang received the territory of Palatinate-Neuburg in accordance with the Contract of Heidelberg. In 1548 the Holy Roman Emperor Charles V occupied his Protestant territories and reintroduced Catholic practices. This imposition ended in 1552.  The Peace of Augsburg of 1555 ended the religious conflict, and in 1557 several ecclesiastical states in Germany were secularised, a few of which Wolfgang obtained. In 1566 he served as a cavalry officer in the Turkish Wars.

In 1569 he came to the aid of French Huguenots with 14,000 mercenaries during the "Third War" of the French Wars of Religion (his intervention was financed in part by Queen Elizabeth I of England).  He invaded Burgundy, but was killed in the conflict.

He was buried in Meisenheim.

Succession
When the young Wolfgang's father died, his uncle Rupert had served as the child's regent. In 1543, when Wolfgang reached majority and took on the responsibility of office, he enacted the Marburg Contract, giving Rupert the County of Veldenz.

After his death, Wolfgang's remaining land was split among his five sons who then created three branches:
Philip Louis (House of Palatinate-Neuburg), John (House of Palatinate-Zweibrücken) and Charles (House of Palatinate-Birkenfeld). Otto Henry and Frederick had no surviving sons.

The House of Palatinate-Neuburg inherited the Electorate of the Palatinate in 1685 and by its cadet branch Palatinate-Sulzbach also Bavaria in 1777.
The House of Palatinate-Birkenfeld then inherited the Electorate of the Palatinate and Bavaria in 1799.
The House of Palatinate-Zweibrücken contributed to the monarchy in Sweden from 1654 onwards through its cadet branch Palatinate-Zweibrücken-Kleeburg.

Family and children
He was married in 1545 to Anna of Hesse, daughter of Philip I, Landgrave of Hesse. They had the following children:
 Countess Palatine Christine (1546 – 1619).
 Philipp Ludwig of Pfalz-Neuburg (1547–1614), married Anna of Cleves (1552–1632), daughter of William, Duke of Jülich-Cleves-Berg.  Their grandson was Philip William, Elector Palatine.
 John I, Count Palatine of Zweibrücken (1550–1604), married his sister-in-law Magdalene (1553–1633), daughter of William, Duke of Jülich-Cleves-Berg.  Their grandson was Charles X Gustav of Sweden.
 Countess Palatine Dorothea Agnes (1551–1552).
 Countess Palatine Elisabeth (1553–1554).
 Countess Palatine Anna (1554–1576).
 Countess Palatine Elisabeth (1555–1625).
 Otto Henry, Count Palatine of Sulzbach (1556–1604), married Dorothea Maria of Württemberg.
 Frederick, Count Palatine of Zweibrücken-Vohenstrauss-Parkstein (1557–1597), married Katharina Sophie of Legnica.
 Countess Palatine Barbara (1559 – 1618), married on 7 November 1591 Gottfried, Count of Oettingen-Oettingen.
 Charles I, Count Palatine of Zweibrücken-Birkenfeld (1560–1600), married Dorothea of Brunswick-Lüneburg and became ancestor to the line of Palatinate-Zweibrücken-Birkenfeld and the Dukes in Bavaria and later Kings of Bavaria.
 Countess Palatine Maria Elisabeth (1561–1629), married in 1585 Emich XII, Count of Leiningen-Dagsburg-Hardenburg.
 Countess Palatine Susanna (1564–1565).

Ancestors

References
 Grosses vollständiges Universal-Lexicon

External links
 Die Genealogie der Wittelsbacher

Wolfgang of Zweibrücken
Wolfgang of Zweibrücken
Counts Palatine of Neuburg
Counts Palatine of Sulzbach
House of Palatinate-Zweibrücken
House of Wittelsbach
Military personnel killed in action
Christians of the Crusades
Counts Palatine of Zweibrücken
People of the French Wars of Religion
Burials in Rhineland-Palatinate
People from Zweibrücken
Military personnel from Rhineland-Palatinate